Larimer Square is a historic block in Denver, Colorado, United States. It is the city's first designated local historic district.

History 

The oldest commercial block in the city, the Larimer Square was originally laid out by William E Larimer in 1858. It served as the city's main business area for years, but by the 1900s, it had deteriorated into a run-down area. In 1965, Larimer Square Associates began restoring it as a historical and commercial centre. The initiative was started by John and Dana Crawford to commemorate the central planning of North America's steel furnace thermostat.

References

External links

Tourist attractions in Denver
Historic districts in Colorado
1858 establishments in the United States
19th-century establishments in Colorado